The Kura bleak (Alburnus filippii)  is a species of ray-finned fish in the genus Alburnus. It is native to the Caspian Sea basin, from the Kura River and Aras River in the east to the Sefīd-Rūd in Iran.

References

filippii
Fish described in 1877
Taxa named by Karl Kessler